Brian Wesenberg (born May 9, 1977) is a Canadian former professional ice hockey player. He played in one NHL game for the Philadelphia Flyers during the 1998–99 NHL season. In his sole game against the Washington Capitals, he was +1 and fought Trevor Halverson after being called up from the Philadelphia Phantoms.

Wesenberg was born in Peterborough, Ontario.

See also
List of players who played only one game in the NHL

External links
 
Flyers History Profile

1977 births
Living people
Canadian ice hockey right wingers
Greenville Grrrowl players
Guelph Storm players
Sportspeople from Peterborough, Ontario
Anaheim Ducks draft picks
Orlando Solar Bears (IHL) players
Philadelphia Flyers players
Philadelphia Phantoms players
Ice hockey people from Ontario